Rafael Edri (born 10 September 1937) is an Israeli former politician who served as Minister of the Environment and Minister without Portfolio between 1988 and 1990.

Early life
Born in Casablanca in Morocco, Edri made aliyah in 1956. In 1965, then known as Raphael Cohen and an oil company engineer, he married Annie-Claude Amar, the daughter of Moroccan Jewish businessman David Amar, in the presence of two members of the Moroccan Cabinet, several former Ministers and the National Police Chief. She died on 6 August 1993.

Edri joined the Labour Party and served as head of Hatzor HaGlilit local council. Away from politics, he was on the executive committee of Solel Boneh, served as director-general and chairman of Shikun Ovdim, and chaired the World Assembly of Maghreb Jews in Israel.

In 1981 he was elected to the Knesset on the Alignment's list. He was re-elected in 1984 and served as chairman of the Alignment parliamentary group and of the national unity government coalition. Re-elected again in 1988, Edri was appointed both Minister without Portfolio in the national unity government of 1988. He left the cabinet in 1990 when the Alignment pulled out of the coalition. After being re-elected in 1992 he became Deputy Speaker of the Knesset, a role he continued in after the 1996 elections. He lost his seat in the 1999 elections.

References

External links

1937 births
Living people
Alignment (Israel) politicians
Deputy Speakers of the Knesset
Israeli Labor Party politicians
Jewish Israeli politicians
Members of the 10th Knesset (1981–1984)
Members of the 11th Knesset (1984–1988)
Members of the 12th Knesset (1988–1992)
Members of the 13th Knesset (1992–1996)
Members of the 14th Knesset (1996–1999)
Ministers of Environment of Israel
Moroccan emigrants to Israel
20th-century Moroccan Jews
People from Casablanca
People from Northern District (Israel)